Pharae, otherwise known as Phara (Φᾶρα), and Pherae, was a town and polis (city-state), situated by the Peiros River, approximately  from the sea and  from the town of Patras, in what is now southern Greece. It was one of the twelve Achaean cities, and one of the four major cities which spearheaded the restoration of the Achaean League in 280 BC. 

In an event called the Social War (220–217 BC), it suffered from various setbacks caused by the attacks of the Aetolians and Eleans. Its territory was later annexed by Augustus, and after the Battle of Actium, it was made a colony of Rome. 

As of the 19th century, Pharae still contained a large agora with a statue of Hermes. The modern village Fares was named after Pharae.

See also 
 List of ancient Greek cities
 Fares (village)

References

Attribution

External links

Populated places in ancient Achaea
Former populated places in Greece
Cities in ancient Greece
Achaean city-states